Fright Night is a 1988 comic book series published by Now Comics. It is based on the 1985 film Fright Night. The first two issues simply adapt the film, but after that the plots are original.

Plot
Charley Brewster is an average teenager who finds his world turned upside-down when vampire Jerry Dandrige moves in next door. He enlists the aid of horror movie star/TV host Peter Vincent to kill Dandrige and they're successful—but not before Charley's best friend, Evil Ed, is transformed into a bloodthirsty monster whom delights in tormenting his former buddy. Soon Peter and Charley team up to fend off a variety of monsters, including squid-men, a spider boy, aliens, a minotaur, an evil sorceress and the nefarious Legion of the Endless Night, a vampire coven which later resurrects Jerry Dandrige.

Aiding Peter and Charley on their adventures are Charley's girlfriend, Natalia Hinnault, whose father has ties to the vampire underworld; Natalia's eccentric Aunt Claudia, who is the reincarnation of Greek Princess Ariadne; and hapless bartender Derek Jones, who seems to have a magnetic attraction to unworldly beings—much to his chagrin. Frequently featured are Evil Ed's minions, freelance reporter Dana Roberts and bartenders Donna and Jane, who all work in the nightclubs that he owns and perform in his band, Eddie and the Vamps. Also regularly seen are a group of mindless, nameless hippies who are continuously in search of a savior to follow, be it good or evil.

Reception

Prints

Main series

Issues

Reprints

Annuals

References

Fright Night (franchise)
Comics based on films
Horror comics
Vampires in comics
Zombies in comics
Werewolf comics
Comics about magic
NOW Comics titles